Jewish Hospital may refer to:

Jewish General Hospital, Montreal, Quebec, Canada
Jewish Rehabilitation Hospital, Laval, Quebec, Canada
Eye and ENT Hospital of Fudan University, formerly Shanghai Jewish Hospital, in Shanghai, China
Jewish Hospital in Hamburg, Hamburg, Germany
The Jewish Hospital in Warsaw, Warsaw, Poland
Tunis Jewish Hospital, Tunis, Tunisia
National Jewish Health, Denver, Colorado, USA
Jewish Hospital (Louisville, Kentucky), USA; part of UofL Health
Barnes-Jewish Hospital, St. Louis, Missouri, USA
Brooklyn Jewish Hospital and Medical Center, Brooklyn, NYC, NYS, USA; operating under that name from 1906 to 1983
Jewish Maternity Hospital, Manhattan, NYC, NYS, USA
Long Island Jewish Hospital, Long Island, New York State, USA
Jewish Hospital (Cincinnati, Ohio), USA
Jewish Hospital for the Aged, Infirmed and Destitute, Philadelphia, Pennsylvania, USA
Victoria Memorial Jewish Hospital, Manchester, England, UK; merged into North Manchester General Hospital

See also

 Galilee Community General Jewish Hospital of Uganda, Kampala, Uganda
 Long Island Jewish Forest Hills, Queens (NYC), Long Island, NYS, USA
 
 
 Jewish (disambiguation)
 Hospital (disambiguation)
 Beth Israel Hospital (disambiguation), hospitals that are traditionally Jewish
 Mount Sinai Hospital (disambiguation), hospitals that are traditionally Jewish
 Sinai Hospital (disambiguation), most of which are traditionally Jewish